was a province of Japan in the area that is today Tokushima Prefecture on the island of Shikoku. Awa was bordered by Tosa, Sanuki, and Iyo Provinces. In terms of the Gokishichidō system, Awa was one of the provinces of the Nankaidō circuit. Under the Engishiki classification system, Awa was ranked as one of the 35 "superior countries" (上国) in terms of importance, and one of the "middle countries" (中国) in terms of distance from the capital. The provincial capital was located in what is now the city of Tokushima.

History
Awa has been settled since the Japanese Paleolithic and the remains of Yayoi and Kofun period settlements and burial mounds have been found especially in the fertile Yoshino River valley. Per the Kogo Shūi, the name of the province was originally written "粟国" and was associated with the production of millet. Per the Kujiki, the kuni no miyatsuko of Awa was a ninth generation descendant of Takamimusubi who had been appointed by Emperor Ōjin. The name of the province was changed to "阿波" in 713 by Empress Genmei as rules for provincial names had been standardized under the Ritsuryō codes to consist of two kanji. During the Kamakura period, the Sasaki clan and the Ogasawara clan were shugo of the province. They were replaced by the Hosokawa clan during the Muromachi period; however, by the Sengoku period, the Hosokawa had been supplanted by the Miyoshi clan, who under Miyoshi Nagayoshi grew in power to rule over large portions of the Kinai region. When the Miyoshi clan became weakened by internal conflicts, the forces of Chōsokabe Motochika of Tosa Province invaded, and by 1585 was able to unify Shikoku under his rule. However, almost immediately, Hashiba Hideyoshi ordered  his armies to invade. The Chōsokabe were defeated after two months and forced back to Tōsa. Awa Province was awarded to one of Hideyoshi's generals, Hachisuka Masakatsu, but he turned the province over to his son Hachisuka Iemasa due to his advanced age. Under the Tokugawa shogunate, the Hachisuka clan continued to rule Awa (and neighboring Awaji Province) from their stronghold at Tokushima Castle  to the end of the Edo Period. Tokushima Domain had a nominal kokudaka of 257,000 koku, making it the 17th largest domain. Following the Meiji restoration and the abolition of the han system in 1871, Awa became "Myōdō Prefecture" (名東県), which was  merged into Kagawa Prefecture. In 1875, the former Sanuki Province was separated out, and in 1876, former Awaji Province was assigned to Hyōgo Prefecture. The former Awa Province was merged with Kōchi Prefecture. In 1880, the former Awa Province was separated from Kōchi to become Tokushima Prefecture. Per the early Meiji period , an official government assessment of the nation’s resources, the province had 584 villages with a total kokudaka of 306,632 koku.

Gallery

Notes

References
 Nussbaum, Louis-Frédéric and Käthe Roth. (2005).  Japan encyclopedia. Cambridge: Harvard University Press. ;  OCLC 58053128

External links 

  Murdoch's map of provinces, 1903

Former provinces of Japan
 
History of Tokushima Prefecture
1871 disestablishments in Japan
States and territories disestablished in 1871